Statistics of Belgian First Division in the 1963–64 season.

Overview 

It was contested by 16 teams, and R.S.C. Anderlecht won the championship.

League standings

Results

References

External links 
 wildstat.com

Belgian Pro League seasons
Belgian
1